Gold Award for Best Actor in a Negative Role is an award given by Zee TV as part of its annual Gold Awards for Indian television series and artists, to recognize a male actor who has delivered an outstanding performance in a supporting role.

The award was first awarded in 2007 and since has been separated in two categories, Critics Award and Popular Award. Critics Award is given by the chosen jury of critics assigned to the function while Popular Award is given on the basis of public voting.

List of winners

2000s
2007 Mohnish Bahl - Ek Ladki Anjaani Si as Veer
Akashdeep Saigal - Kyunki Saas Bhi Kabhi Bahu Thi as Eklavya Virani 
Jatin Shah - Kasturi as Raunak Singhania
Chetan Hansraj - Kahaani Ghar Ghar Kii as Shasha
Vikas Manaktala - Left Right Left as Cadet Amardeep Hooda
Ronit Roy - Kasamh Se as Aparjit Deb
2008 Chetan Hansraj - Kahaani Ghar Ghar Kii as Shasha
Akashdeep Saigal - Kyunki Saas Bhi Kabhi Bahu Thi as Eklavya Virani 
Jatin Shah - Kasturi as Raunak Singhania
Chetan Hansraj - Dharti Ka Veer Yodha Prithviraj Chauhan as Raja Bhimdev 
Satyajit Sharma - Balika Vadhu as Basant Singh
 Raj Premi - Jai Shri Krishna as Kans
2009 Not Held

2010s
2010 Sudesh Berry - Agle Janam Mohe Bitiya Hi Kijo as Loha Singh
Satyajit Sharma - Balika Vadhu as Basant Singh
Sharad Kelkar - Bairi Piya as Thakur Digvijay Singh
Aadesh Chaudhary - Laagi Tujhse Lagan as Digamber
Anand Goradia - Na Aana Is Des Laado as Gajender Sangwan 
2011 Anupam Shyam - Mann Kee Awaaz Pratigya as Thakur Sajjan Singh
Vishwajeet Pradhan - Maryada: Lekin Kab Tak? as Brahmanand
Nikhil Arya - Tere Liye as Ritesh Basu
 Pankaj Vishnu - Pavitra Rishta as Arjit Lokhande
2012 Anupam Shyam - Mann Kee Awaaz Pratigya as Thakur Sajjan Singh
Mahesh Shetty - Bade Achhe Lagte Hain as Siddhant Kapoor
Kiran Karmarkar - Uttaran as Tej Singh Bundela
Karanvir Bohra - Dil Se Di Dua... Saubhagyavati Bhava? as  Viraj Dobriyal
2013 Mahesh Shetty - Bade Achhe Lagte Hain as Siddhant Kapoor
Kiran Karmarkar - Uttaran as Tej Singh Bundela
Vikram Singh Chauhan - Qubool Hai as Imran Qureshi 
Kanwarjit Paintal - Pyaar Ka Dard Hai Meetha Meetha Pyaara Pyaara as Jagdish Gupta
Akshay Dogra - Punar Vivaah as Akash Sindhia
2014 Mohit Malik - Doli Armaano Ki as Samrat Singh Rathore
2015 Mohit Malik - Doli Armaano Ki as Samrat Singh Rathore
2016 Sangram Singh - Ye Hai Mohabbatein as  Ashok Khanna
2017 Ayub Khan - Shakti - Astitva Ke Ehsaas Ki as Maninder Singh
2018 Arjun Bijlani - Ishq Mein Marjawan as Deep Raj Singh
2019 Karan Singh Grover - Kasautii Zindagii Kay as Rishabh Bajaj

References

Best Actor in a Negative Role